Introduction to the End of an Argument / Intifada - Speaking for Oneself... Speaking for Others (Arabic: مقدمة لنهائيات جدال Transliteration: Muqadimmah Li-Nihāyāt Jidāl) is a 1990 experimental documentary directed by Jayce Salloum and Elia Suleiman. It utilises found footage sourced from films, news footage, documentaries and 'live' footage from the West Bank and Gaza to critique the representation of Palestinians, Arabs and the Middle East frequently found in Western media.

Plot 

Footage from newsreels, feature films and documentaries are woven together, loosely organised by title cards, such as 'INTIFADA', 'SPEAKING FOR ONESELF', and 'ABSENCE'. In doing so it reveals Orientalist portrayals of Arabs in the history of cinema, as well as the argument over narratives that exists within the media when discussing the Middle East and in particular, narratives surrounding Palestinians.

Films Referenced 

 Harum Scarum (film)
 Exodus (1960 film)
 Lawrence of Arabia (film)
 The Sheik (film)

References

External links 
 Introduction to the End of an Argument on Vimeo

Films directed by Elia Suleiman
1990 documentary films
1990 films